Ramstein Castle is the name of the following ruined castles:

France
 Ramstein Castle (Alsace) near Scherwiller, department of Bas-Rhin, Region Grand Est
 Ramstein Castle (Lorraine) near  Baerenthal, department of Moselle, Region Grand Est

Germany

 Ramstein Castle (Kordel) near Kordel, county of Trier-Saarburg, Rhineland-Palatinate
 Ramstein Castle (Schramberg) near Tennenbronn (Schramberg), county of Rottweil, Baden-Württemberg

Switzerland
 Ramstein Castle (Bretzwil) near Bretzwil, district of Waldenburg, canton of Basel-Landschaft